The Farm of Seven Sins (French: La Ferme des sept péchés) is a 1949 French historical drama film directed by Jean Devaivre and starring Jacques Dumesnil, Claude Génia and Aimé Clariond.

The film's sets were designed by the art director Robert Hubert.

Synopsis
During the 1820s, a notorious opponent of France's Bourbon Restoration is murdered in his country house. The authorities investigate whether it was his friends or enemies who killed him.

Awards
The film won the Golden Leopard award at the 1949 Locarno International Film Festival

Cast
 Jacques Dumesnil as Paul-Louis Courier 
 Claude Génia as Herminie  
 Aimé Clariond as Le marquis de Siblas  
 Pierre Renoir as Le procureur Edmond de Chancey  
 Alfred Adam as Symphorien Dubois  
 Georges Grey as Pierre Dubois  
 Palau as Le juge d'instruction / Examining judge  
 Arthur Devère as Frémont  
 Héléna Manson as Michèle Frémont dite La Michel  
 Jacques Dufilho as François Sovignant  
 René Génin as Le maire d'Azay  
 Jean Vilar as L'homme gris / Grey man  
 Georges Bever as Le maire de Luynes  
 Jean Marchan as Guillaume 
 Albert Broquin as Un paysan  
 Harry-Max
 Julien Maffre as Un paysan  
 Albert Malbert as Un paysan  
 Henri Niel as L'aubergiste  
 Marcel Pérès as Coupeau

References

Bibliography
 Crisp, Colin. French Cinema—A Critical Filmography: Volume 2, 1940-1958. Indiana University Press, 2015.

External links

1949 films
French black-and-white films
Films directed by Jean Devaivre
Golden Leopard winners
1940s French-language films
French historical drama films
1940s historical drama films
Films set in the 1820s
1949 drama films
Films scored by Joseph Kosma
1940s French films